Alaja,, is a small, unincorporated populated place in Balkan Province in western Turkmenistan on the Caspian Sea.  It is the site of an oil-loading terminal.

Etymology
In the Turkmen language, alaja is an amulet bracelet woven of alternating colors of thread, usually black and white, worn to ward off the evil eye.  The original Turkic meaning of the term is "striped", hence the name of the locality, because "there is water on both sides".

See also 
 Balkan Province
 List of cities, towns and villages in Turkmenistan

References

Populated coastal places in Turkmenistan
Populated places in Balkan Region